The 1972 Columbia Lions football team was an American football team that represented Columbia University during the 1972 NCAA University Division football season. Columbia tied for sixth in the Ivy League. 

In their fifth season under head coach Frank Navarro, the Lions compiled a 3–5–1 record but outscored opponents 143 to 125. Don Jackson, Paul Kaliades and Jesse Parks were the team captains.  

The Lions' 2–4–1 conference record tied for sixth in the Ivy League standings. Columbia was outscored 118 to 96 by Ivy opponents. 

Columbia played its home games at Baker Field in Upper Manhattan, in New York City.

Schedule

References

Columbia
Columbia Lions football seasons
Columbia Lions football